John Mahendran is an Indian film director and screenwriter who has worked on Tamil and Telugu and language films. John is the son of noted Tamil film maker Mahendran.

Career
John Mahendran directed two low-key Telugu films: Preminchedi Endukamma and Neetho. He remade Neetho in Tamil as Sachein (2005) with Vijay, Genelia D'Souza and Bipasha Basu in the lead roles. John later worked on the independent Tamil film Aanivaer (2006), which told the story of a doctor caught up in the Sri Lankan civil war. The film won positive reviews and had a limited release across regions with Tamil diaspora.

In the early 2010s, John has worked on the script of Settai (2013) by helping director Kannan re-work the script of Hindi film Delhi Belly and on writing dialogues for Ambikapathy, the dubbed Tamil version of Raanjhanaa (2013) starring Dhanush and Sonam kapoor Directed by Anand.L.Rai . Subsequently, he worked as a writer on film including Kaashmora (2016) starring Karthi and Nayanthara Directed by Gokul and Motta Siva Ketta Siva (2017), while working as a screenplay and dialogue writing teacher at the Bofta Film Institute based in Chennai. Currently he is writing for the Tamil movie Visithiran, official remake of Malayalam movie Joseph, Directed by M.Padmakumar.

Filmography

Director

Actor

Writer
All films are in Tamil including dubs. He has translated other language films into Tamil.

References

https://www.imdb.com/title/tt23710126/

https://www.imdb.com/title/tt13540288/

https://m.imdb.com/title/tt10805970/characters/nm1892316?ref_=tt_cl_c_4

https://g.co/kgs/VFikG3 http://www.tamilsydney.com/content/view/44/37/

Living people
Telugu film directors
Tamil film directors
Tamil screenwriters
Year of birth missing (living people)
21st-century Indian film directors